Madden NFL 15 is an American football sports video game based on the National Football League and published by EA Sports. The game was announced for the PlayStation 3, PlayStation 4, Xbox 360 and Xbox One on April 28, 2014, and was released on August 26, 2014, in the United States and Europe three days later. As in previous years, EA Sports conducted a fan vote via ESPN to elect the cover athlete for the game. Seattle Seahawks cornerback Richard Sherman won the cover vote and the rest of the Legion of Boom defense was featured on the game's start menu. The PS3 and Xbox 360 versions are based on Madden NFL 25.

Cover vote
Due to the late release of the game, EA created a much smaller bracket than the previous years with a cover vote. It featured a 169-player bracket with offensive and defensive players. On June 6, 2014, Seattle Seahawks cornerback Richard Sherman was announced as the official cover athlete. Also featured in the bracket were Alshon Jeffery, Jimmy Graham, Demaryius Thomas, Luke Kuechly, Colin Kaepernick, Nick Foles, Cam Newton, Antonio Brown, Jamaal Charles, A. J. Green, LeSean McCoy, T. Y. Hilton, Andrew Luck, Eddie Lacy and Alfred Morris. The official cover image was released on the NFL's Instagram page.

Development
The game was announced in late April 2014. It was shown in a release video featuring Carolina Panthers linebacker and Defensive Player of the Year Luke Kuechly. The game was further detailed at Electronic Entertainment Expo 2014; a particular emphasis was placed on improvements to defensive play. Creative director Rex Dickson noted that many players had difficulties with the pass rush and tackling; the "player lock" camera from NCAA Football 14 was added, along with a cone (similar to the controversial "QB Vision" cone from Madden NFL 06) to determine whether or not a player can make a non-aggressive tackle against a player from their current location.

In an effort to improve the presentation of the game, Brian Murray, who was mentored by NFL Films' Steve Sabol and was a consultant on previous editions, was given a new role as "Presentation Director" for the game. Work was made on using technology introduced in previous installments, along with a new "global dynamic camera system", to give the game's "broadcasts" a more professional feel with more details; these include the replacement of pre-rendered "post-play" cut scenes with dynamic scenes that feature players interacting, and can, additionally, respond to references of players by commentators with relevant camera shots and on-screen graphics, and the revival of the halftime show. Jumbotrons in stadiums now display scenes generated by the dynamic cameras (as opposed to generic splash screens or the same camera angle in use), and NFL teams also provided the graphics they use for their respective screens and ribbon displays.

After Ray Rice's indefinite suspension on September 8, 2014, EA Sports announced they would completely remove Rice from the game. His card in Madden Ultimate Team was renamed Baltimore Halfback #25.

Release
The game was released in North America on August 26, 2014, for PlayStation 3, Xbox 360, PlayStation 4 and Xbox One.

Soundtrack
Madden NFL 15's menu music was once again an original orchestrated score, composed by Mark Petrie, while a licensed soundtrack is also used, but only plays in stadiums. The following songs play in stadiums during playcalling. Mark Petrie's original score could also be played in the menus of Madden NFL 16 and Madden NFL 17.

Reception

Madden NFL 15 was met with mostly positive reviews from critics. On Metacritic, the game has scores of 80 and 82 on Xbox One and PlayStation 4, respectively (both score higher than the respective scores of 73 and 74 that Madden NFL 25 received). IGN gave the game a score of 8.7/10, praising the graphics and improved gameplay, while noting the mediocre commentary, but said that it is both "exciting and reassuring" that EA Sports is not wasting opportunities to improve the series.

The PS3 and Xbox 360 versions of Madden NFL 15 received backlash for removing certain features; online team play was the most notable omission, forcing users to play only 1v1 games. In a review for gaming website Destructoid, Steven Hansen called the last-gen versions an "extra scummy ripoff" that tends to run poorly due to slow loading times and a "clunky" UI. Hansen also noted the absence of the defensive view and player lock features that were in the PS4 and Xbox One versions. Hansen summed up his review by declaring the PS3 and Xbox 360 versions "junky, janky and inferior".

Madden NFL 15 was the second best-selling retail game in the United States in 2014, behind Call of Duty: Advanced Warfare.

References

External links
 
 

2014 video games
EA Sports games
Madden NFL
PlayStation 3 games
PlayStation 4 games
Video games developed in the United States
Video games scored by Mark Petrie
Video games set in the United States
Xbox 360 games
Xbox One games